William August Kratzert III (born June 29, 1952) is an American professional golfer and sportscaster, who has played on both the PGA Tour and the Champions Tour.

Early life

Kratzert was born in Quantico, Virginia when his father was in the service but spent most of his youth in Fort Wayne, Indiana, where he attended Elmhurst High School. His father was head pro for over 20 years at the Fort Wayne Country Club. Kratzert won the Indiana State Amateur at age 16.

Amateur career 
Kratzert attended the University of Georgia in Athens, Georgia. He was a distinguished member of the golf team and an All-American in 1973 and 1974. Kratzert graduated with a Bachelor of Business Administration (BBA) degree in 1974. He turned pro in that same year. Kratzert, after two failed attempts at earning his Tour card, quit golf and worked as a forklift operator. After eight months at that job, Kratzert returned to golf and succeeded on his third attempt in 1976 to get his PGA Tour card.

Professional career

Kratzert won four PGA Tour events in his career. His most successful years in professional golf were 1977–1980 when he finished in the top-12 on the money list in three of those 4 years. Kratzert's best year for majors was 1978, when he finished with a T-5 in The Masters and a T-6 in the U.S. Open. His career earnings exceed $1.4 million. He continued to play on the PGA Tour until 1997, when he went to work as a television golf commentator.

Since turning 50 in June 2002, Kratzert has played some on the Champions Tour with his best finish a T10 at the 2003 Royal Caribbean Golf Classic.

Kratzert has worked for many years as a TV golf analyst for outlets such as the Golf Channel, ESPN, CBS, NBC, Turner Sports, SiriusXM PGA Tour Radio and pgatour.com.

Kratzert was inducted into the Indiana Golf Hall of Fame in 1993. He lives in Ponte Vedra Beach, Florida with his wife and three children. His sister, Cathy Gerring, is also a professional golfer and has won three times on the LPGA Tour.

Amateur wins
1968 Indiana Amateur

Professional wins (5)

PGA Tour wins (4)

PGA Tour playoff record (1–1)

Other wins
1970 Indiana Open (as an amateur)

Results in major championships

CUT = missed the halfway cut
"T" indicates a tie for a place.

See also
Spring 1976 PGA Tour Qualifying School graduates
1993 PGA Tour Qualifying School graduates

References

External links

American male golfers
Georgia Bulldogs men's golfers
PGA Tour golfers
PGA Tour Champions golfers
Golf writers and broadcasters
Golfers from Virginia
Golfers from Indiana
Golfers from Florida
American sports announcers
People from Quantico, Virginia
Sportspeople from Fort Wayne, Indiana
People from Ponte Vedra Beach, Florida
1952 births
Living people